Robert Aley (fl. 1529) was an English politician.

Aley was a Member of Parliament for Weymouth in 1529.

References

Year of birth unknown
Year of death unknown
English MPs 1529–1536
16th-century deaths